The 1950 edition of the Campeonato Carioca kicked off on August 12, 1950 and ended on January 28, 1951. It was organized by FMF (Federação Metropolitana de Futebol, or Metropolitan Football Federation). Eleven teams participated. Vasco da Gama won the title for the 9th time. no teams were relegated.

System
The tournament would be disputed in a double round-robin format, with the team with the most points winning the title.

Championship

Top Scorers

References

Campeonato Carioca seasons
Carioca